Trevor Morris  (6 September 1920 – 3 February 2003) was a Welsh professional footballer and manager.

Playing career
The son of a miner from Carmarthenshire, Morris began his career with Ipswich Town. He made his debut on 6 May 1939 in a 0–0 draw with Bournemouth & Boscombe Athletic on the final day of the 1938–39 season. With the outbreak of the Second World War, Morris' playing career came to an end when he suffered a broken leg while playing for Cardiff City as a guest in a wartime cup match against Bristol City.

Second World War
During the Second World War, Morris served in RAF Bomber Command and piloted the lead aircraft in a squadron of 40 Avro Lancaster's on D-Day. He flew more than 40 missions over enemy territory and was awarded the Distinguished Flying Medal in May 1945.

Managerial career
He returned to football in 1946 as Cardiff City's assistant secretary, and was promoted to manager-secretary in 1954 after the resignation of Cyril Spiers. Morris was unable to stop the club's relegation from the First Division and, after struggling the following year in Division Two, he resigned and instead took over at their South Wales rivals Swansea Town.

He was sacked following Swansea's relegation to the Third Division in 1965. He later had a short spell as general manager of Newport County.

Later life
In 1971, he was appointed secretary of the Football Association of Wales, where he remained until 1982 when he stepped down due to a heart condition. In the 1976 New Year Honours, Morris was appointed an Officer of the Order of the British Empire (OBE) for his services to Welsh football.

One of Morris's long-term achievements was the acceptance of the principle that footballers could play for a country with which they had blood ties but which was not the country of their birth. He died on 3 February 2003.

Managerial statistics

References

External links

Trevor Morris' profile at Pride of Anglia

1920 births
2003 deaths
Cardiff City F.C. players
Ipswich Town F.C. players
Cardiff City F.C. wartime guest players
Welsh footballers
Welsh football managers
Cardiff City F.C. non-playing staff
Cardiff City F.C. managers
Swansea City A.F.C. managers
Recipients of the Distinguished Flying Medal
Officers of the Order of the British Empire
Royal Air Force personnel of World War II
Association football wing halves